The Nissan R390 GT1 was a racing car built in Atsugi, Japan. It was designed primarily to gain a suitable racing entry in the 24 Hours of Le Mans in 1997 and 1998. It was built to race under the grand touring style rules, requiring a homologated road version to be built. Therefore, the R390 was built originally as road car, then a racing version of the car was developed afterwards. Only one R390 road car was ever built and is stored at Nissan's Zama facility, although one of the race cars was later modified for road use. However, this claim has never been proven.

History

After returning to sports car racing in 1995, Nismo (Nissan motorsport) had some measure of success with their Skyline GT-R LM which had competed in the GT1 class. However, these cars were quickly outpaced by the influx of new manufacturers who were using loopholes in the GT regulations to build racing cars that bore little resemblance to their GT1 class competitors, examples being the Mercedes-Benz CLK GTR and the Porsche 911 GT1. Nismo's Skyline GT-R therefore needed to be replaced with a purpose built racing car.

Turning to Tom Walkinshaw Racing (TWR), Nismo began developing a prototype of the R390 GT1, named to follow in the tradition started in the 1960s with Nissan's R380. The first decision for Nismo and TWR was the choice of engine. The previous Skyline GT-R LM had used the trusted RB26DETT Inline-six engine, but the design was old for a racing car, employing an iron block which added weight and had a high center of gravity. Nismo instead chose to resurrect an engine from the Nissan R89C, a racing car from the Group C era. Its powerplant, the VRH35Z, was a  V8 engine which used an aluminium block, as well as having a lower center of gravity and a better ability to be used as a stressed member over the RB26.

The car's styling group was led by Ian Callum of Tom Walkinshaw Racing (TWR). The mechanical and aerodynamic design was led both by Tony Southgate, also of Tom Walkinshaw Racing (TWR), and Mr. Yutaka Hagiwara of Nismo. Southgate was the designer of the Jaguar XJR-9 amongst other TWR sports cars, which had won at Le Mans. Due to this, the R390 GT1 bears a resemblance to the Jaguar XJR-15, which was also developed by TWR and based on the XJR-9, and in fact used a cockpit - including the tub, greenhouse and roof line - from the very same tooling as the XJR-15, with some custom tooling blocks added to the XJR15 chassis mold, although for the R390, the rear and front ends, and suspension were completely different and were designed to meet GT1 specifications, the R390's chassis was lower and wider, but slightly shorter in length than the Jaguar, making the R390 larger overall. Development of the car was achieved in a small amount of time, especially due to the use of an existing engine. Nismo and TWR also had to build a road legal version of the R390 GT1 in order to meet homologation requirements. A red R390 prototype underwent wind tunnel testing and aerodynamic improvements in England, however, the final car was built and tested in Atsugi, Japan. Only one road legal R390 was built, which is currently in storage at Nissan's Zama, Kanagawa facility.

After all three cars failed scrutineering at the 1997 event, they had to be modified in order to be allowed to race. This subsequently led to overheating problems for the gearbox, and ultimately led to their failure during the race. That is why for 1998, the R390 was modified, most notably in the extension of its rear bodywork to create increased "luggage space" in order to satisfy the ACO, a new rear wing for racing models (the road legal version had no wing), and a rear diffuser for improved downforce were added.

Racing results

Completed in time for the 1997 24 Hours of Le Mans, the three cars finished in a black and red livery were the fastest in their first competition, with Martin Brundle taking pole position in May's pre-qualifying with a staggering time of 3.43.15. At the race itself, one R390 GT1 (#22) was able to qualify in 4th on the grid and 2nd in its class behind a Porsche 911 GT1, while its partners qualified 12th (#21) and 21st(#23). During the race both cars were able to perform admirably, but soon began to struggle with gearbox problems and, around halfway through the race, two of the three cars (#21 & #22) finally succumbed to mechanical failure and were withdrawn. The third R390 was able to survive the rest of the race (albeit with two complete gearbox changes along the way) finishing 12th overall and 5th in class, although many laps down from the race winners.

For the 1998 season, Nissan returned, this time with four cars. The cars were slightly upgraded, with more downforce able to be generated by a longer rear tail, a new rear diffuser, and on racing versions, a new rear wing placement for less drag. Although Nissan was easily beaten in qualifying by Porsche, and Mercedes-Benz, Nissan was able to achieve considerable success in the race. As an achievement of its own, all four cars were able to finish the race.  With this, Nissan was able to finish 3rd, 5th, 6th, and 10th overall, being beaten only by the Porsche 911 GT1.

Following the 1998 24 Hours of Le Mans, rules for the GT classes were changed, mostly to end the number of manufacturers attempting to use loopholes. This meant Nissan was forced to abandon the R390 as it was no longer legal. Nissan instead turned to the LMP classes, developing the R391 prototype for 1999. This program would also be short lived and Nissan would end up leaving Le Mans.

A total of eight R390 GT1 race chassis were built over the two years of the program.

Road car

Only one R390 road car was ever produced by Nissan as a prototype for the development of the race-cars and was never intended for sale, although Nissan did offer to build further versions at a value of US$1 million. The lone R390 GT1 is currently stored at Nismo's Zama warehouse, along with the #32 R390 GT1 race car from 1998.

All of this power is sent to the rear wheels via a six-speed sequential manual transmission.

Initially built in 1997 with a red paint scheme and given the UK registration number "P835 GUD", the car was displayed at the 1997 24 Hours of Le Mans race. It was rebuilt in 1998 with a new front end and side vents, longer tail and a ducktail spoiler instead of a wing, and repainted blue. This car was given the fake registration number "R390 NIS" for photos and magazine articles (not a genuine UK number) and became known as the long tail version. These modifications were also incorporated on the race cars albeit with the addition of a fixed rear wing instead of a ducktail spoiler.

A second R390 GT1 was later registered for road use by Érik Comas. Unlike the original R390 GT1 road car, this example was modified from chassis VIN780009 after Comas purchased it from Nissan. The modification was done by Andrea Chiavenuto, who led a two year long restoration and street conversion project on the car. The car was claimed to retain 95% of its original racing car parts, but several parts such as door panels, glass windshield, cooling system and upholstery had to be installed in order to meet road regulations.

References

External links 

Nissan racing cars
Grand tourer racing cars
24 Hours of Le Mans race cars
Rear mid-engine, rear-wheel-drive vehicles